Bosma is a West Frisian toponymic surname meaning "from/of the forest". Variants are Boschma, Boskma and Bossema. Notable people with the surname include:

Bosma
Brian Bosma (born 1957), American (Indiana) politician
Javier Bosma (born 1969), Spanish beach volleyball player
Koen Bosma (born 1990), Dutch football forward
Martin Bosma (born 1964), Dutch PVV politician and journalist
Remco Bosma (born 1971), Dutch VVD politician
Tim Bosma (died 2013), Canadian murder victim
Boschma
Hilbrand Boschma (1893–1976), Dutch zoologist and museum director
Named after him: Boschma's frogfish and Boschma's scampi
 (1922–1997), Dutch sculptor

See also
Bosman, Dutch surname

References

Surnames of Frisian origin
Surnames of Dutch origin
Toponymic surnames
Lists of people by surname